Enrico De Nicola,  (9 November 1877 – 1 October 1959) was an Italian jurist, journalist, politician, and provisional head of state of republican Italy from 1946 to 1948. Afterwards, he became the first president of Italy on 1 January 1948.

Biography
Enrico De Nicola was born in Naples and became famous as a penal lawyer. He studied law in the University of Naples, graduating in 1896. As a Liberal he was elected a deputy for the first time in 1909 and, from 1913 to 1921, he filled minor governmental posts until the advent of fascism, when he retired from political life. He served as Under-Secretary of State for the Colonies in the Giolitti government (November 1913 — March 1914) and Under-Secretary of State for the Treasury in the Orlando cabinet (January–June 1919). On 26 June 1920, he was elected speaker of the Chamber of Deputies, holding office until January 1924. He was appointed senator by King Victor Emmanuel III in 1929, but he refused to take his seat and never took part in the workings of the Assembly.

He returned to his law practice, only taking an interest in politics again after the fall of Italian Fascism. After Benito Mussolini's fall from power in 1943, king Victor Emmanuel tried to extricate the monarchy from its collaboration with the Fascist regime; De Nicola was perhaps the most influential mediator in the ensuing transition. The king's son Umberto acquired a new title of "Lieutenant-General of the Realm" and took over most of the functions of the sovereign. Victor Emanuel later abdicated; Umberto became king as Umberto II and a Constitutional Referendum was held, won by republicans. A new Constituent Assembly was elected, and prime minister Alcide de Gasperi became acting head of state for a few weeks when Umberto II was exiled and left Italy. The Constituent Assembly then elected De Nicola Provisional Head of State on 28 June 1946, with 80% of the votes, at the first round of voting. Giulio Andreotti later recalled that De Nicola — a man of great modesty — was not sure whether to accept the nomination, and underwent frequent changes of mind in the face of repeated insistence by all the major political leaders. Andreotti recalled that the journalist Manlio Lupinacci then issued an appeal to De Nicola in the pages of Il Giornale d'Italia: "Your Excellency, please, decide to decide if you can accept to accept...."

On 25 June 1947, De Nicola resigned from the post, citing health reasons, but the Constituent Assembly immediately re-elected him again the following day, having recognized in his act signs of nobility and humility. After the Italian Constitution took effect, he was formally named the "President of the Italian Republic" on 1 January 1948. He finally refused to be a candidate for the first constitutional election the following May, in which Luigi Einaudi was elected to the Quirinale, the formal seat of the Italian presidency.

In 1948, De Nicola became a senator for life as a former Head of State, and later was elected President of the Senate, and of the Constitutional Court.

He died at Torre del Greco, in the province of Naples, on 1 October 1959. He was unmarried and had no children.

Honors
 – Order of the Star of Italian Solidarity

 – Order of Merit of the Italian Republic (1956)

Political titles
His other political titles included President of the Italian Chamber of Deputies, Temporary Chief of the Italian State and President of the Italian Senate.

References

Bibliography and notes
 Andrea Jelardi, Enrico De Nicola. Il presidente galantuomo, Kairòs, Naples (2009).

External links
 

|-

|-

|-

1877 births
1959 deaths
19th-century Neapolitan people
Italian Liberal Party politicians
Presidents of Italy
Presidents of the Chamber of Deputies (Italy)
Presidents of the Italian Senate
Deputies of Legislature XXIII of the Kingdom of Italy
Deputies of Legislature XXIV of the Kingdom of Italy
Deputies of Legislature XXV of the Kingdom of Italy
Deputies of Legislature XXVI of the Kingdom of Italy
Members of the Senate of the Kingdom of Italy
Members of the National Council (Italy)
Senators of Legislature I of Italy
Senators of Legislature II of Italy
Senators of Legislature III of Italy
Italian life senators
Presidents of the Constitutional Court of Italy
Knights Grand Cross with Collar of the Order of Merit of the Italian Republic
Grand Crosses 1st class of the Order of Merit of the Federal Republic of Germany
20th-century Italian judges